The 2007 Tandridge District Council election took place on 3 May 2007 to elect members of Tandridge District Council in Surrey, England. One third of the council was up for election and the Conservative Party stayed in overall control of the council.

After the election, the composition of the council was:
Conservative 30
Liberal Democrat 10
Labour 1
Independent 1

Election result
Overall turnout at the election was 42.31%.

Ward results

References

2007
2007 English local elections
2000s in Surrey